Enrico di Robilant (1924 – 10 October 2012) was an Italian philosopher of law. He taught philosophy of law and political philosophy at the University of Turin (Faculty of Law), where he had been a follower of Norberto Bobbio.
He focused his attention on classical liberalism, Canon Law, libertarian legal theory, and the relationship between Catholicism and Law.

Publications
 L'inaccettabilità del potere assoluto dello stato in materia fiscale, in Fisco e libertà, ed. Veniero del Punta, E. di Robilant et al. (Roma, Armando Armando 1981).

References

Italian philosophers
Italian legal scholars
Academic staff of the University of Turin
2012 deaths
Philosophers of law
1924 births
Jurists from Turin